Bolma bathyraphis is a species of sea snail, a marine gastropod mollusk in the family Turbinidae, the turban snails.

Description
The size of the shell attains 35 mm. The imperforate shell has a turbinate shape with a conical spire, nine whorls and deeply, broadly canaliculate sutures. The spire is marked by a row of granules. The white apex is obtuse and plane. The periphery is formed of a squamose keel which is spirally irregularly striated. it ascends the spire above the sutural furrow, and between it and the suture there is a series of very small white granules. Of the row of granules upon the lower half of the body whorl, the third from the periphery is a little larger than the first and second  and much larger than those below. Both above and below this third row a few spiral elevated lines are noticeable. The aperture, has an irregular rounded shape.  Although quite smooth within, it has the appearance of being sulcated, the pseudo-sulci corresponding to the rows of granules.

Distribution
This marine species occurs in the Eastern Indian Ocean and off the Maldives and New Caledonia.

References

External links
 To World Register of Marine Species
 

bathyraphis
Gastropods described in 1899